In psychology, rigidity or mental rigidity refers to an obstinate inability to yield or a refusal to appreciate another person's viewpoint or emotions characterized by a lack of empathy. It can also refer to the tendency to perseverate, which is the inability to change habits and the inability to modify concepts and attitudes once developed.

A specific example of rigidity is functional fixedness, which is a difficulty conceiving new uses for familiar objects.

History 
Rigidity is an ancient part of our human cognition. Systematic research on rigidity can be found tracing back to Gestalt psychologists, going as far back as the late 19th to early 20th century with Max Wertheimer, Wolfgang Köhler, and Kurt Koffka in Germany. With more than 100 years of research on the matter there is some established and clear data. Nonetheless, there is still much controversy surrounding several of the fundamental aspects of rigidity. In the early stages of approaching the idea of rigidity, it is treated as "a unidimensional continuum ranging from rigid at one end to flexible at the other". This idea dates back to the 1800s and was later articulated by Charles Spearman who described it as mental inertia. Prior to 1960 many definitions for the term rigidity were afloat. One example includes Kurt Goldstein's, which he stated, "adherence to a present performance in an inadequate way", another being Milton Rokeach saying the definition was, "[the] inability to change one's set when the objective conditions demand it". Others have simplified rigidity down to stages for easy defining. Generally, it is agreed upon that it is evidenced by the identification of mental or behavioral sets.

Lewin and Kounin also proposed a theory of cognitive rigidity (also called Lewin-Kounin formulation) based on a Gestalt perspective and they used it to explain a behavior in mentally retarded persons that is inflexible, repetitive, and unchanging. The theory proposed that it is caused by a greater "stiffness" or impermeability between inner-personal regions of individuals, which influence behavior. Rigidity was particularly explored in Lewin's views regarding the degree of differentiation among children. He posited that a mentally retarded child can be distinguished from the normal child due to the smaller capacity for dynamic rearrangement in terms of his psychical systems.

Mental set 
Mental sets represent a form of rigidity in which an individual behaves or believes in a certain way due to prior experience. It's a type of cognitive bias that can lead people to make assumptions about how they should solve problems without taking into account all the information available. The opposite of this is termed cognitive flexibility. These mental sets may not always be consciously recognized by the bearer. In the field of psychology, mental sets are typically examined in the process of problem solving, with an emphasis on the process of breaking away from particular mental sets into formulation of insight. Breaking mental sets in order to successfully resolve problems fall under three typical stages: a) tendency to solve a problem in a fixed way, b) unsuccessfully solving a problem using methods suggested by prior experience, and c) realizing that the solution requires different methods. Components of high executive functioning, such as the interplay between working memory and inhibition, are essential to effective switching between mental sets for different situations. Individual differences in mental sets vary, with one study producing a variety of cautious and risky strategies in individual responses to a reaction time test.

Causes 
Rigidity can be a learned behavioral trait, for example if the subject has a parent, boss or teacher who demonstrated the same form of behavior towards them. Rigidity is also associated with autism spectrum conditions, and has a genetic component.

Stages 
Rigidity has three different main "stages" of severity, although it never has to move to further stages. The first stage is a strict perception that causes one to persist in their ways and be close-minded to other things. The second involves a motive to defend the ego. The third stage is that it is a part of one's personality and you can see it in their perception, cognition, and social interactions.

Traits 
We often see traits that occur alongside rigidity.

Accompanying externalizing behaviors 
They could be external behaviors, such as the following:

 Insistently repetitious behavior
 Difficulty with unmet expectations
 Perfectionism
 Compulsions (as in OCD)
 Perseveration

Accompanying internalizing behaviors 
Internalizing behaviors also are shown:

 Perfectionism
 Obsessions (as in OCD)

Manifestations of rigidity

Associated conditions

Cognitive closure 
Mental rigidity often features a high need for cognitive closure, meaning that they assign explanations prematurely to things with a determination that this is truth, finding that resolution of the dissonance as reassuring as finding the truth. Then, there is little reason to correct their unconscious misattributions if it would bring uncertainty back.

Autism spectrum disorder 
Cognitive rigidity is one feature of autism spectrum disorder (ASD). It is included in what's called the Broader Autism Phenotype, where a collection of autistic traits still fail to reach the level of ASD. This is one example of how rigidity does not show up as a single trait, but comes with a number of related traits.

Obsessive-compulsive disorder

Scrupulosity

Effects

Ethnocentrism 
Rigidity may be a cause of ethnocentrism. In one study, M. Rokeach tested for ethnocentrism's relatedness to mental rigidity by using the California Ethnocentrism Scale (when measuring American college students' views) and the California Attitude Scale (when measuring children's views) before they were given what is called by cognitive scientists "the water jar problem." This problem teaches students a set pattern for how to solve each one. Those that scored higher in ethnocentrism also showed attributes of rigidity such as persistence of mental sets and more complicated thought processes.

Strategies for overcoming rigidity

Consequences of unfulfillment 
If a person with cognitive rigidity does not fulfill their rigidly held expectations, the following could occur:

 Agitation
 Aggression
 Self-injurious behavior
 Depression
 Anxiety
 Suicidality

These are clearly maladaptive, and so there are other ways to overcome this: 

Use of The Power of TED* & The Winner's Triangle are both Therapeutic models that use the Karpman_drama_triangle derived from Transactional Analysis

References

See also
 Set (psychology)
Cognitive inertia
Neuroplasticity
Cognitive flexibility
Einstellung effect
Abnormal posturing

Cognitive psychology